Bulbostylis burbidgeae is a flowering plant in the sedge family, Cyperaceae, that is native to Western Australia.

It blooms between March and August producing brown flowers.

It is found among granite outcrops and at cliff bases in the Pilbara region north of Newman where it grows in granitic soils.

The species was first described in 1980 by Karen Wilson, and the species epithet, burbidgeae, honours Nancy Burbidge.

References

burbidgeae
Plants described in 1980
Angiosperms of Western Australia
Taxa named by Karen Louise Wilson